Concord is a ghost town in Angelina County, in the U.S. state of Texas. It is located within the Lufkin, Texas micropolitan area.

History
The area in what is known as Concord today was first settled by Colonel T.L. Mott and his family, who moved to Texas with his family from Alabama in the late 1850s. They established a church with other area families that next decade and named it after the Book of Concord, which is referenced in the second book of Corinthians in the Bible. It continued to operate until the Sam Rayburn Reservoir was built in the 1960s. The church and cemetery then moved to Zavalla. A log cabin and corn crib were purchased by Bennie Polk Morgan who moved them to Jasper County.

Geography

Education
Concord had its school in 1900. Today, the ghost town is located within the Zavalla Independent School District.

See also
List of ghost towns in Texas

References

Geography of Angelina County, Texas
Ghost towns in East Texas